Haput (also, Hapıt, Chagadzhik Gaput, Gapyt, Khapit, and Khaput) is a village in the Quba Rayon of Azerbaijan.

References 

Populated places in Quba District (Azerbaijan)